Stevens Lake may refer to:

 A lake in Colchester County, Nova Scotia
 Stevens Lakes (Idaho), a chain of lakes
 A lake in Florida, one of the sources of Black Creek